George Gibson may refer to:

Sportspeople
 George Gibson (baseball) (1880–1967), Canadian baseball player
 George Gibson (American football) (1905–2004), American football player
 George Gibson (Tasmania cricketer) (1827–1873), Australian cricketer
 George Gibson (Victoria cricketer) (1827–1910), Australian cricketer
 George Ralph Gibson (1878–1939), English rugby union player
 George Gibson (footballer, born 1903) (1903–1977), Scottish footballer (Hamilton, Bolton, Chelsea)
 George Gibson (footballer, born 1912) (1912–1990), English footballer
 George Gibson (footballer, born 1945), Scottish footballer

 George Gibson (footballer, born 2000), Norwegian footballer
 George Gibson (Australian footballer) (1885–1933), Australian footballer for Essendon and Richmond

Others
 George Gibson, Lewis and Clark Expedition member
 George Gibson (1775–1861), United States Army's first Commissary General of Subsistence.
 George Gibson (trade unionist) (1885–1953), British trade unionist and director of the Bank of England
 George Ernest Gibson (1884–1959), Scottish born American nuclear chemist
 George Gibson Coote (1880–1959), Canadian politician
 George Stacey Gibson (1818–1883), British businessman
 George Alexander Gibson (1853–1913), Scottish physician
 George Gibson (mathematician) (1858–1930), Scottish mathematician and academic author